Astert is an Ortsgemeinde – a community belonging to a Verbandsgemeinde – in the Westerwaldkreis in Rhineland-Palatinate, Germany.

Geography

Location
The community lies in the Westerwald between Limburg and Siegen in the Kroppacher Schweiz (“Kroppach Switzerland”), a nature and landscape conservation area. Through the community flows the river Große Nister. In 1985, Astert was chosen as Rhineland-Palatinate's prettiest place in the contest Unser Dorf soll schöner werden (“Our village should become lovelier”). Astert belongs to the Verbandsgemeinde of Hachenburg, a kind of collective municipality. Its seat is in the like-named town.

Constituent communities
Astert's Ortsteile are Oberdorf and Unterdorf.

History
In 1282, Astert had its first documentary mention in a document from the Marienstatt Monastery, in which it was named as Asterode.

 Statistik zur Einwohnerentwicklung

Politics

The municipal council is made up of 8 council members who were elected in a majority vote in a municipal election on 7 June 2009.

Regular events
In this small but lively community, village festivals can be enjoyed almost every month. The raising of the Maypole and Carnival, roo, are times when both old and young inhabitants can celebrate together. The community's youth, who are not very strongly represented, like to gather at the Backes (an old baking house).

Culinary specialities
Moreover, there is something else that sets Astert apart, its speciality. It is known as Asterter Klüsen – a regional word for dumplings. They are a well loved dish not only among the locals, but also for people from the neighbouring communities, who enjoy this hearty dish. The dumplings’ recipe and preparation, however, are things that only longtime village ladies may know. The art of cooking the Asterter Klüsen, though, is taught younger ladies so that this delight does not pass away into legend.

Economy and infrastructure

South of the community runs Bundesstraße 414, which leads from Altenkirchen to Hachenburg. The nearest Autobahn interchanges are in Siegen and Wilsdorf on the A 45 (Dortmund–Gießen), roughly 25 km away. The nearest InterCityExpress stop lies about 40 km away at the railway station at Montabaur on the Cologne-Frankfurt high-speed rail line.

References

External links
Astert in the collective municipality’s Web pages 
Asterter Klüsen 
Astert 

Municipalities in Rhineland-Palatinate
Westerwaldkreis
Kroppach Switzerland